The Dirk Diggler Story is a 1988 mockumentary short film written and directed by Paul Thomas Anderson. It follows the rise and fall of Dirk Diggler, a well-endowed male porn star. The character was modeled on American porn actor John Holmes. The film was later expanded into Anderson's 1997 film Boogie Nights.

Plot summary
Dirk Diggler (Michael Stein) was born as Steven Samuel Adams on April 15, 1961 outside of Saint Paul, Minnesota. His parents are a construction worker and a boutique shop owner who attend church every Sunday. Looking for a career as a male model, Diggler drops out of school at age 16 and leaves home. Jack Horner (Robert Ridgely) discovers Diggler at a falafel stand. Diggler meets his friend, Reed Rothchild (Eddie Delcore), through Horner in 1979, while working on a film.

Horner slowly introduces Diggler to the business until Diggler becomes noticeable within the industry. Diggler becomes a prominent model and begins appearing in pornographic films. Diggler has critical and box office hits which lead him to stardom. The hits and publicity lead to fame and money, which lead Diggler to the world of drugs. With the amount of money Diggler is making, he is able to support both his and Rothchild's addictions. The drugs eventually cause a breakup between Diggler and Horner since Diggler is having issues with his performance on set.

After the breakup, Diggler tries to make a film himself, but it is never completed. He then attempts a music career, which is successful, but leads him deeper into drugs because of the amount of money he is making. He then stars in a TV show which is a failure, both critically and commercially. Having failed and with no work, Diggler returns to the porn industry, taking roles in low-budget gay porn to pay for his addictions. On July 17, 1981, during a film shoot, Diggler dies of a drug overdose.

The film ends with a quotation from Diggler: "All I ever wanted was a cool '78 'Vette and a house in the country."

Cast
Michael Stein – Steven Samuel Adams (Dirk Diggler)
Robert Ridgely – Jack Horner
Eddie Delcore – Reed Rothchild
Rusty Schwimmer – Candy Kane
Ernie Anderson – Narrator

Production
The film was Anderson's first real production having experimented with what he called "standard fare". Anderson conceived the film when he was 17 years old and a senior at Montclair College Preparatory School. Anderson called his friend Michael Stein, telling him to come over for a production meeting, and told Stein his idea: "John Holmes". Stein loved the idea and was cast to play the role of Dirk Diggler; he selected his own wardrobe. Stein showed Anderson some video of his friend Eddie Dalcour, who was a professional body builder, which Anderson loved and cast him in the role of Reed Rothchild. Anderson's father, Ernie Anderson, narrated the film and Robert Ridgely, a friend of Anderson's father, played the role of Jack Horner.

The film was shot in 1987 using a video camera and steadicam provided by Anderson's father (Ernie "Ghoulardi" Anderson). Some scenes were shot at a motel. Anderson raised money for the film by cleaning cages in a pet store. Being influenced by This is Spinal Tap at the time, he decided to do a mockumentary and used the John Holmes documentary, Exhausted, as a model for the film, even taking some dialogue almost word-for-word. Anderson worked from a shot list and wanted the actors to be serious since the characters took their work seriously. Anderson edited the film using two VCRs. According to Anderson, the film drew admiring laughs when it was shown at a University of Southern California film festival.

Boogie Nights
The Dirk Diggler Story was expanded into Anderson's 1997 breakout film Boogie Nights with a number of scenes appearing almost verbatim in both films. Two actors had roles in both films; in Boogie Nights, Robert Ridgely played The Colonel, a pornography financier, and Michael Stein made an appearance as a stereo store customer. The main differences between The Dirk Diggler Story and Boogie Nights are the mockumentary versus narratives styles in the former and latter films, respectively; Diggler's stint in gay porn in the first film versus his prostitution in the second; and Diggler's dying from an overdose in the first film versus his happy return to his former roles and lifestyle in the second.

References

External links 

 Transcript of 2004 documentary "The Real Dirk Diggler"

1988 films
Films directed by Paul Thomas Anderson
Films with screenplays by Paul Thomas Anderson
American mockumentary films
1988 short films
American short films
Films set in the 1980s
Films about pornography
1988 directorial debut films
1980s English-language films
1980s American films